was a rural district located in Nishimikawa Region in central Aichi Prefecture, Japan. The entire district is now part of the city of Toyota.

History
Kamo District (加茂郡) was one of the ancient districts of Shinano Province, but was transferred to Mikawa Province during the Sengoku period. In the cadastral reforms of the early Meiji period, on July 22, 1878, Kamo District was divided into Higashikamo District and Nishikamo District within Aichi Prefecture. With the organization of municipalities on October 1, 1889, Higashikamo District was divided into 18 villages.

Asuke Village was elevated to town status on December 17, 1890, and two new villages were created in 1889 and 1890. In a round of consolidation, the remaining number of villages was reduced from 19 to six in 1906.
On April 1, 1955, three of the remaining villages (Morioka, Kamo, and Aro) were annexed by Asuke Town; however, a new village (Asahi) was created through a border adjustment with parts of Sanno Village formerly in Ena District, Gifu Prefecture.
On November 1, 1961, the village of Matsudaira gained town status, followed by the Asahi on.
The town of Matsudaira was annexed by the city of Koromo on April 1, 1967.
On October 1, 2003, the town of Inabu was transferred from Kitashitara District to Higashikamo District, leaving the district with two towns and one village.
  
As of 2004 (the last data available), the district had an estimated population of 16,703 and a population density of 43.84 persons per km2. Its total area was 381.06 km2.

As a result of the Municipal mergers and dissolutions in Japan, on April 1, 2005, the towns of Asuke, Asahi and Inabu, and the village of Shimoyama; along with the town of Fujioka, and the village of Obara (both from Nishikamo District), were all merged into the expanded city of Toyota. Therefore, Higashikamo District was dissolved as a result of this merger.

See also
 Nishikamo District, Aichi
 Kamo District, Gifu
 Kamo District, Hiroshima
 Kamo District, Shizuoka

External links
Counties of Japan

Former districts of Aichi Prefecture